Eastmountainsouth was an American pop rock duo formed in 1999 composed of vocalists Kat Maslich-Bode and Peter Bradley Adams.

The duo released their self-titled debut album in 2003 after signing a deal with Dreamworks Records. This is the duo's one and only album as they parted ways after its release. Both have since released work on solo projects since their split in 2004.

Several of the duo's songs have been used in films and television episodes. Their cover of Stephen Foster's song "Hard Times (Come Again No More)" was featured on the Elizabethtown motion picture soundtrack. The track "So Are You To Me" was featured on the soundtrack of the movie Lucky 7 and appeared in the episode "Truth Takes Time" of the television series Alias. Their song "You Dance" was featured in a first-season episode of the television series One Tree Hill, and the song "Ghost" was used in a fifth-season episode of Dawson's Creek. Another song, "All the Stars", was featured in the TV series Smallville.

In 2003, the duo opened for Lucinda Williams, Tracy Chapman and Nelly Furtado.

References

American pop music groups
Rock music groups from California
Musical groups established in 1999
Musical groups from Los Angeles
Musical groups disestablished in 2004
American musical duos
DreamWorks Records artists
American folk musical groups
1999 establishments in California